Mark Watring (born May 2, 1963), is a Puerto Rican equestrian who in 2003, won a gold medal in the Pan American Games.

Early years
Watring was born in Aguadilla, Puerto Rico, where he was raised. Watring's father was a soldier stationed at Ramey Air Force Base in Aguadilla. It was there that his father and mother met and were later married. He learned at a young age how to ride horses and did not know that someday he would represent Puerto Rico in the Olympics.

Equestrian competitions
In 1984, Watring qualified and participated at the Olympic Games in Los Angeles, California in eventing. In 2001, Watring was named the American Grand Prix Association's (AGA) "Rookie of the Year".  On May 27, 2002 Watring won the $35,000 Lexus of Glendale Memorial Grand Prix prize money, at the Memorial Day Classic Horse Show aboard his horse "Sapphire".  Watring bested a field of 25 starters with a double clear rounds and the fastest time in the jump off of 41.176 seconds.  This win moved Watring and his mount "Sapphire", into fourth place standing for "AGA Rider" and "Horse of the Year".

2004 Olympic Games
On August 16, 2003 Watring represented the United States in the Pan American Games celebrated in the Dominican Republic.  The United States won the Gold Medal with a final total of 13.66 penalties compared to the 21.87 posted by Mexico.  When presented the Gold Medal, Watring unfurled and waved the Puerto Rican Flag. This win secured a berth in the 2004 Olympic Games in Athens, Greece.

On February 15, 2004, Watring and his mount "Sapphire" came in third place in the Bayer/USET Grand Prix, Indio Desert circuit III.  He won $9,700 in prize money.  Watring participated and represented Puerto Rico in the showjumping event in  the 2004 Olympic Games.

Later years
Watring currently rides and trains in Southern California where he also teaches both children and adults.  His wife Jenny is the captain of the Foxfield Drill team.  The team rides without bridles or saddles.  The Drill Team did an exhibition in the 1984 Olympic Games and continues to do  exhibitions all over the country, including in Madison Square Garden. In 2008, Watring announced that he planned in cloning his horse "Sapphire". If his venture to clone Sapphire is successful, it will be the first cloned show jumper born in the United States. "

Monies won
Total Money Won:
 2004         AGA Series $1,050
 2004         Adjusted AGA Serties $4,400
 2002/2003    AGA Season $19,620
 2001/2002    AGA Tour $13,000

See also

 List of Puerto Ricans
 German immigration to Puerto Rico

References

External links
 
 Mark Watring
 Mark Watring Stables Website

1963 births
Living people
Puerto Rican male equestrians
Show jumping riders
Olympic equestrians of Puerto Rico
Equestrians at the 1984 Summer Olympics
Equestrians at the 2004 Summer Olympics
Equestrians at the 2003 Pan American Games
Equestrians at the 2007 Pan American Games
Equestrians at the 2011 Pan American Games
People from Aguadilla, Puerto Rico
Puerto Rican people of German descent
Pan American Games gold medalists for Puerto Rico
Pan American Games medalists in equestrian
Central American and Caribbean Games gold medalists for Puerto Rico
Central American and Caribbean Games silver medalists for Puerto Rico
Competitors at the 2002 Central American and Caribbean Games
Competitors at the 2006 Central American and Caribbean Games
Competitors at the 2010 Central American and Caribbean Games
Central American and Caribbean Games medalists in equestrian
Medalists at the 2003 Pan American Games